Humera is a town in the Kafta Humera woreda in the Tigray Region of Ethiopia. The Tekezé river borders the town to the north. Humera is a very important regional agricultural center based on intensive agriculture. It is the last Ethiopian town south of the border with Eritrea and Sudan, and is considered to be a strategically important gateway to Sudan.

History

20th century 
Prior to the Ethiopian revolution, large agricultural businesses were established to grow soybean and other crops for export. By 1971, there were 700,000 hectares being farmed.

Humera is part of the Wolqayt-Tsegede area, which historically has been part of the former province of Semien also commonly known as Gondar. During the Ethiopian Civil War, Teranafit and its successor, the Ethiopian Democratic Union (EDU), drew much of their support from the commercial farmers of Humera and Wolqayit, and gained control of Humera in early 1977; Derg forces with tanks and armored cars retook Humera on 10 June, and the officers of the EDU fled to Sudan. The Derg used Humera as a base for military campaigns against the Tigrayan People's Liberation Front (TPLF) until their Third Revolutionary Army was crushed in the Battle of Shire on 19 February 1989; this forced the government to withdraw its garrison at Humera a few days later, and by the end of the month evacuate Tigray entirely. The TPLF then took control of the area, and created a supply line out of reach of the Derg.

On 26 March 1989, Humera was bombed from the air by the Ethiopian Air Force.

In the first few months after the beginning of the Eritrean-Ethiopian War, most of the population fled south to the villages of Ba'eker (11,000), May Kedra (5,000), and Bereket (4,000). These refugees later returned to Humera.

21st century 
On 13 March 2008, a bomb exploded on a public bus in Humera, which killed eight people and wounded at least 27 more. The government arrested the alleged perpetrators, who testified in court they had acted on behalf of dissident groups supported by Eritrea. Their trial was still in process at the end of the year.

In November 2020, the town was shelled during the Tigray War. The Humera massacre of ethnic Tigrayans took place. Responsibility for the massacre was attributed by refugees to Amharan militias, including Fano, and to the Ethiopian National Defense Force (ENDF). Most inhabitants fled. Administration of the town was taken over by officials from Amhara Region. In 2021, people were found having been tortured, tied up and thrown in the Tekeze River.

Demographics 
Based on the 2007 Census conducted by the Central Statistical Agency of Ethiopia (CSA), this town has a total population of 21,653, of whom 11,395 are men and 10,258 women; this is an increase of 14,451 over the 1994 national census. With an area of 153.03 square kilometers, Humera has a population density of 141.50. A total of 49.84% households were counted in this woreda, resulting in an average of 6,360 persons to a household, and 3.40 housing units. The majority of the inhabitants said they practiced Ethiopian Orthodox Christianity, with 93.18% reporting that as their religion, while 6.45% of the population were Muslim.

Ethnic demographics of Kafta Humera woreda

Geography 
Humera is located in northwestern Ethiopia. The Tekezé river runs to the west of Humera. The town is spread on the east bank of the river. Humera is located at altitude ranges from 585 m above sea level.

Climate 
Humera has a hot semi-arid climate (Köppen climate classification BSh). The overall climate throughout the year is mild and dry. The annual rainfall ranges between 400 and 600 mm, with most of the rain falling in the rainy season (June up to September).

Economy
The population increases dramatically during the farming season each year, when migrant workers arrive from all over the country. Sesame, sorghum, and Arabic gum are among the most common crops.

Transport

The town is served by Humera Airport. Although it wasn't operational due to a border dispute, on 26 July 2009 after three years of construction by the Ethiopian Airports Enterprise, the airport was officially reopened. A runway three kilometers long and 45 meters wide was constructed, capable of handling present-day aircraft including Antonov 124s. The airport was opened at the cost of 182 million birr. Ethiopian Airlines serves the airport with destinations to Addis Ababa and Mek'ele. The opening of the airport was aimed at increasing the agricultural sector in the region as well as providing commercial air service in Humera.

See also

 Humera massacre
 Fano (militia)
 Tigray conflict

References 

Eritrea–Ethiopia border crossings
Populated places in the Tigray Region